Douglas Andrew Mientkiewicz (born June 19, 1974) is an American former professional baseball player and manager. He played in Major League Baseball as a first baseman from 1998 to 2009, most prominently as a member of the Minnesota Twins where he was a Gold Glove Award winner. Mientkiewicz was also a member of the 2004 World Series winning Boston Red Sox team. He is one of five players to win both an Olympic gold medal and a World Series championship.

After his playing career, Mientkiewicz briefly worked as a television sports analyst before serving as a minor league manager in the Los Angeles Dodgers and Detroit Tigers organizations.

High school
Mientkiewicz attended Westminster Christian School in Palmetto Bay, Florida, where he was a teammate of Alex Rodriguez and Dan Perkins. Mientkiewicz had a batting cage in his backyard which his high school teammates would use as they pleased. He also played tight end while Rodriguez played quarterback on the school's football team. Upon graduation, he was drafted by the Toronto Blue Jays in the 12th round of the 1992 Major League Baseball Draft, but chose instead to play at Florida State University.

College career
In his third season with the Seminoles, Mientkiewicz led the team with a .371 batting average, 19 home runs and 80 runs batted in. Florida State earned their first Atlantic Coast Conference Championship, and Mientkiewicz was named ACC Atlantic I Regional Most Valuable Player. After the season, Mientkiewicz was drafted by the Minnesota Twins in the fifth round of the 1995 Major League Baseball Draft. Mientkiewicz was elected to the Florida State University Athletics Hall of Fame in 2005.

Minor league career
In 1998, he batted .323, with a .432 on-base percentage and .508 slugging percentage in 509 at-bats for the New Britain Rock Cats to earn Eastern League (Double-A) All-Star honors, and a September call-up to the Twins. He batted .200 with two runs batted in in 25 at-bats for the Twins.

Mientkiewicz earned a roster spot with the Twins the following spring without having playing in Triple-A, and batted .229 with two home runs and 32 runs batted in sharing playing time with Ron Coomer at first base in 1999. After a full season in the majors, Mientkiewicz spent the 2000 season with the Twins' Triple-A affiliate, the Salt Lake Buzz. He was the Triple-A All-Star first baseman, and Pacific Coast League All-Star designated hitter. He batted .334, with a .446 on-base percentage and a .524 slugging percentage in 485 at-bats for Salt Lake, while both scoring and driving in 96 runs.

After the Triple-A season, Mientkiewicz joined the U.S. Olympic team at the 2000 games in Sydney. Mientkiewicz hit the game-winning home run against South Korea in the semi-finals to help the U.S. capture its first-ever gold medal in baseball. Following the Olympics, he spent three games with the Twins, collecting six hits in fourteen at-bats.

In LVBP he played one season with Navegantes del Magallanes in the 1999-2000 season batting for .268 with 2 homers and 10 RBI.

Major league career

Minnesota Twins
In 2001, Mientkiewicz was awarded the starting first base job for the Twins, and responded by batting .306 with fifteen home runs and 74 runs batted in (all career highs) while earning the American League Gold Glove award for top defensive first baseman.

His numbers dipped in 2002; however, he reached the post-season for the first time in his career, and hit two home runs in the 2002 American League Division Series against the Oakland Athletics. The Twins battled the Chicago White Sox and Kansas City Royals for the division crown all season long in 2003.

Mientkiewicz drew the ire of the Chicago White Sox and their fans by suggesting that the All-Star Game, scheduled to be played at U.S. Cellular Field on July 15, should be moved to a different venue after a fan attacked umpire Laz Diaz during an April 15 game between the White Sox and Royals. Chicago White Sox General Manager Kenny Williams shot back that Mientkiewicz should not worry about the game's location because he would not be there.

The fans booed Mientkiewicz the first time he and the Twins came to U.S. Cellular Field on April 25, and cheered White Sox starter Mark Buehrle for hitting Mientkiewicz with a pitch during his first at-bat.

Following a mid-September three-game sweep over the White Sox at the Hubert H. Humphrey Metrodome that gave the Twins a  game lead in the American League Central, Mientkiewicz again got himself in the crosshairs by commenting in a postgame television interview, "They're done," about his Central Division rivals. The Twins won the division by four games over the Chicago White Sox, but were eliminated by the New York Yankees in the 2003 American League Division Series.

Boston Red Sox
As the trade deadline approached, the 2004 Boston Red Sox found themselves  games in back of the New York Yankees in the American League East, and one game in back of the Texas Rangers in the wild card race. With infield defense proving to be their Achilles' heel, they made a four-team trade deadline deal on July 31 that landed Mientkiewicz and Montreal Expos shortstop Orlando Cabrera with the Boston Red Sox, and sent Justin Jones to the Twins. Coincidentally, the Twins were playing a home series against the Red Sox at the time. On July 30th, 2004, Mientkiewicz went 2-4, scoring one run as a member of the Minnesota Twins. The next day, July 31, 2004, Mientkiewicz was in the visiting dugout as a member of the Boston Red Sox, and started at first base and hit sixth in the lineup. The Red Sox also sent Nomar Garciaparra and Matt Murton to the Chicago Cubs, and the Cubs sent Francis Beltrán, Alex Gonzalez and Brendan Harris to the Expos as part of this trade.

Mientkiewicz and Cabrera proved valuable additions to their new franchise as the Red Sox surged to within three games of the Yankees by the end of the season, and took the A.L. wild card by seven games over the Oakland A's. On August 16, Mientkiewicz made an emergency start at second base, a position he had only ever played four times in the minor leagues, and never in the majors.

Mientkiewicz went 4-for-10 in the post-season. He did not appear in any of the first three games of the 2004 American League Championship Series that the Red Sox lost to the New York Yankees; however, he appeared in all of the final four that they won in their come-from-behind series win.

When St. Louis Cardinals shortstop Édgar Rentería grounded back to pitcher Keith Foulke, who trotted toward first base and underhanded the ball to Mientkiewicz to complete Boston's four-game sweep of the World Series, Mientkiewicz kept the ball, as dictated by baseball tradition. As Boston had not won a World Series in 86 years, the ball symbolized the end of the so-called "Curse of the Bambino", and was of considerable interest to memorabilia collectors.

Controversy resulted when the Red Sox asked for the ball's return, and Mientkiewicz refused to give it back. Shortly after his January 27 trade to the New York Mets, Mientkiewicz and the Red Sox reached an agreement that the Red Sox would hold the ball temporarily and could display it across New England, along with the World Series trophy. The agreement called for Mientkiewicz to get the ball back at the end of 2005 unless the ultimate issue of ownership has been otherwise resolved. In the controversy that followed, Mientkiewicz received death threats against himself and his wife.

On November 30, 2005, lawyers for the Red Sox filed suit in Suffolk Superior Court asking the court to place the ball in a secure location until ownership was decided. The club's legal team said that Mientkiewicz had gained possession of the ball only because he was a Red Sox employee and that the ball remained the team's property. On April 23, 2006, it was announced that he had reached an agreement with the Red Sox, and the ball would go to the Baseball Hall of Fame.

Mets/Royals
Mientkiewicz began the 2005 season as the Mets' everyday first baseman, but lost his starting job to prospect Mike Jacobs by the end of the season. During the following season with the Kansas City Royals, he compiled a .283 batting average and 43 runs batted in, his most since playing with Minnesota. He was not offered a contract by the Royals, and on January 5, 2007, he signed a one-year deal with the New York Yankees.

New York Yankees
On June 2, 2007, Mientkiewicz collided with Mike Lowell of the Boston Red Sox while trying to field a throw from shortstop Derek Jeter. He suffered a mild concussion and a fractured scaphoid bone in his right wrist and was placed on the disabled list. Mientkiewicz missed three months of the season, and did not return until September 4. He made his first start since the injury on September 16, and went two-for-three in the Yankees' 4–3 victory over the Red Sox.

For the season, he batted .277 with five home runs and 24 runs batted in. He made the post-season for the fourth time in his career, and was hitless in six at-bats.

Pittsburgh Pirates

On February 11, 2008, Mientkiewicz signed a minor league contract with an invitation to spring training with the Pittsburgh Pirates. In his only season in Pittsburgh, he batted .277 with two home runs and 30 runs batted in, mostly backing up Adam LaRoche at first base. He also made 33 appearances at third base and ten in right field. He briefly left the team during the season while his wife, Jodi, had heart surgery.

Los Angeles Dodgers
On February 26, 2009, Mientkiewicz signed a minor league contract with an invitation to spring training with the Los Angeles Dodgers. He made the Major League roster as a pinch hitter and appeared in seven games for the Dodgers in April before dislocating his shoulder sliding into second base and being placed on the 60-day disabled list. After a brief rehab stint with the Triple-A Albuquerque Isotopes from July 28 to August 17, Mientkiewicz rejoined the Dodgers in September, seeing sporadic action as a pinch hitter down the stretch. He collected six hits in eighteen at-bats, only one of which was for extra bases, and had three runs batted in.

Mientkiewicz signed a minor league contract with the Dodgers for the 2010 season, and came to camp to compete for the left-handed pinch hitter role. He was offered a coaching position with the team when he did not make the club out of spring training, but opted instead to keep playing and become a free agent.

Florida Marlins
On May 5, 2010, he signed a minor league contract with the Florida Marlins, but was released just nine days later after playing four games for the Marlins' Triple A affiliate, the New Orleans Zephyrs. Mientkiewicz's deal included a one-day out clause for May 16, and the Marlins chose to cut him loose before he could exercise it.

Following his release, Mientkiewicz chose to retire from baseball.

Broadcasting
After retirement, Mientkiewicz worked as an analyst for the 2010 MLB post-season for CBSSports.com.

Coaching/managing
Mientkiewicz made his coaching debut in 2012 in the Los Angeles Dodgers organization as the hitting coach of the rookie league Ogden Raptors in the Pioneer League. After 2012, he was hired by the Minnesota Twins organization as the Manager of the high-Class A Fort Myers Miracle, the team he played for in 1995–96 to start his baseball career. Mientikiewicz got the Miracle off to a fast start in 2013 as the team tied a franchise record by winning their first 14 games of the season (equaling the mark set in 1995 and tied in 2007) and ended April with a Minor League best 21 wins (21-4).

In October 2014, Mientkiewicz was a finalist to become the manager of the Minnesota Twins. Ultimately, Paul Molitor was selected as Twins manager, and Mientkiewicz managed the Double-A Chattanooga Lookouts in 2015–16 before returning to Fort Myers for a second term as the Miracle's skipper. He was fired after the 2017 season.

On November 16, 2017, Mientkiewicz was named the manager of the Toledo Mud Hens, the Detroit Tigers' Triple-A affiliate. On October 31, 2019, he was fired by the Mud Hens.

See also
 List of Olympic Games gold medalists who won World Series
 List of Olympic medalists in baseball
 List of people from Toledo, Ohio

References

External links
, or Retrosheet, or Pelota Binaria

1974 births
Living people
Albuquerque Isotopes players
American people of Polish descent
Baseball players at the 2000 Summer Olympics
Baseball players from Ohio
Boston Red Sox players
Chattanooga Lookouts managers
Fort Myers Miracle players
Florida State Seminoles baseball players
Gold Glove Award winners
Gulf Coast Mets players
Inland Empire 66ers of San Bernardino players
Kansas City Royals players
Los Angeles Dodgers players
Major League Baseball first basemen
Medalists at the 2000 Summer Olympics
Minnesota Twins players
Navegantes del Magallanes players
American expatriate baseball players in Venezuela
New Britain Rock Cats players
New Orleans Zephyrs players
New York Mets players
New York Yankees players
Olympic gold medalists for the United States in baseball
Pittsburgh Pirates players
Salt Lake Buzz players
Scranton/Wilkes-Barre Yankees players
Sportspeople from Toledo, Ohio
St. Lucie Mets players
Tampa Yankees players
Toledo Mud Hens managers
Peninsula Oilers players